Ballou is an unincorporated community in southern Will County, Illinois, United States. It is located three miles southeast of the city of Wilmington in Wesley Township.

Ballou is home to only a few houses and a grain elevator that serves the area farms. Other than the eponymous Ballou Road, a two-lane country road, there are no city streets or services. A railroad track that formerly crossed Ballou Road next to the grain elevator was dismantled in the 1990s.

References

Unincorporated communities in Will County, Illinois
Unincorporated communities in Illinois